Let's See was a Canadian television series broadcast on CBC Television between September 6, 1952 to July 4, 1953. The segment, which had a running time of 15 minutes, was a puppet show with a character named Uncle Chichimus (voice of John Conway), which presented each evening's schedule as well as the weather forecast. Percy Saltzman was host and Larry D. Mann was a regular.

The show was produced by Norman Campbell, Franz Kraemer, Norman Jewison, and Don Brown. Joan Hughes was the script assistant.

External links
 Queen's University Directory of CBC Television Series (Let's See archived listing link via archive.org)
  Let's See at Canadian Communications Foundation
 

1950s Canadian variety television series
CBC Television original programming
1952 Canadian television series debuts
1953 Canadian television series endings
1950s Canadian children's television series
Black-and-white Canadian television shows
Canadian television shows featuring puppetry